The Maricopa Unified School District is the main public school district in the city of Maricopa, Arizona. It operates six elementary schools, two middle schools, and two high schools. The district (as of 2018) is at an "A" rating.

Schools

Elementary
 Butterfield Elementary 
 Saddleback Elementary 
 Santa Rosa Elementary 
 Santa Cruz Elementary 
 Maricopa Elementary 
 Pima Butte Elementary

Middle
 Desert Wind Middle School  
 Maricopa Wells Middle School

High
 Desert Sunrise High School
 Maricopa High School

References

External links
 

School districts in Pinal County, Arizona
Maricopa, Arizona